Baylies is a surname. Notable people with the surname include:

Carolyn Baylies (1947–2003), American academic and activist
Edmund L. Baylies (1857–1932), American lawyer and philanthropist
Francis Baylies (1783–1852), American politician
Frank Leaman Baylies (1895—1918), American World War I flying ace
Nicholas Baylies (1768-1847), American judge
Thomas Baylies (1687–1756), Quaker ironmaster
William Baylies (1776-1865), American politician
William Baylies (1724–1787), British physician